William Brent Jackson (born November 8, 1957) is an American politician and businessman serving as a Republican member of the North Carolina Senate, representing the 9th district, which includes Jones, Duplin, Pender, Bladen, and Sampson counties.

Career

Business
Jackson is the founder of Jackson Farming Company, an agricultural business that grows watermelons, cantaloupes, honeydews, strawberries, pumpkins, squash, slicer cucumbers, sweet potatoes, corn, wheat, soybeans, peanuts, and flue-cured tobacco. Jackson owns two country grain elevators for the purpose of purchasing and storing corn, small grains, and wheat from his farm and area farmers. In 2005, he expanded and built a liquid fertilizer plant, which supplies his farms and area farmers with drip fertilizer.

North Carolina Senate
Jackson is co-chairman of the Senate Appropriations/Base Budget Committee, and the immediate past co-chairman of the Senate Appropriations Subcommittee on Natural and Economic Resources and the Senate Agriculture/Environment/Natural Resources Committee. He is also co-chairman of the Joint Environmental Review Commission, Joint Agriculture and Forestry Awareness Study Commission and the Agriculture and Rural Caucus of the North Carolina General Assembly. Additionally, Jackson sits on the Senate Finance Committee, Rules and Operations of the Senate Committee, and Senate State and Local Government Committee. In 2014, he was elected to the Legislative Board of the international organization, State Agriculture and Rural Leaders.

In 2015, Jackson authored an ag-gag bill subsequently made law after the legislature overrode a veto by Governor Pat McCrory. The bill allows for prosecution of individuals who go undercover to expose animal cruelty and other illegal activity in the North Carolina factory animal farming industries.

In May 2019, a building owned by Jackson Farming Company suffered significant fire damage and was destroyed.

Electoral history

2022

2020

2018

2016

2014

2012

2010

Personal life
Jackson was born in Clinton, North Carolina and lives in Autryville with Debbie, his wife of 41 years. He is active in his church, Union Grove Baptist Church, and is the father of three sons and grandfather of three grandchildren.

References

|-

Republican Party North Carolina state senators
1957 births
Living people
21st-century American politicians
People from Clinton, North Carolina